Peter Bathurst (3 May 16871748), of Greatworth, Northamptonshire and Clarendon Park, near Salisbury, Wiltshire, was a British landowner and Tory politician who sat in the House of Commons between 1711 and 1741.

Bathurst was the second son of Sir Benjamin Bathurst, MP, of Paulerspury, Northamptonshire and his wife Frances Apsley, daughter of Sir Allen Apsley, MP of Apsley, Sussex. As a child he was a companion to the Duke of Gloucester, with his brother Benjamin, at the court of Princess Anne. He was educated at Eton College in about 1700, and matriculated at Trinity College, Oxford in 1703. His father  left him lands in Lincolnshire.   He married Leonora-Maria How, daughter of Charles How of Greatworth, Northamptonshire in 1709 and acquired part of his father-in-law's estate.  His wife died in January 1720, and he married as his second wife Lady Selina Shirley, daughter of Robert Shirley, 1st Earl Ferrers on 24 October 1720. He  also acquired at some stage the Clarendon Park estate near Wilton which he made his main residence.
 
Bathurst was returned on petition as Tory Member of Parliament for Wilton on 17 March 1711 following the 1710 British general election. He was  a member of the October Club, and was listed as a ‘worthy patriot’ who was involved in detecting the mismanagements of the previous Whig administration.

After standing unsuccessfully for Salisbury at the 1722 British general election, Bathurst was returned as Tory  MP for Cirencester on the family interest at the 1727 British general election. He followed his brother, Allen, Lord Bathurst, in Parliament, and voted regularly against the Government in all recorded divisions. At the 1734 British general election, when Cirencester was not available, he changed seats and was returned as MP for Salisbury. He again voted  against the Government, except when he was one of the Tories who withdrew on the motion for Walpole's dismissal in 1741. His only recorded speech was in 1736, against a bill to prevent clandestine marriages. He did not stand at the 1741 British general election and was  defeated at Salisbury at the 1747 British general election.
 
Bathurst died on 6 May 1748 and was buried at Laverstock where he has a fulsome monumental inscription. He was described  as ‘a lover of letters and liberal knowledge, affectionate and affable to a numerous family’. He had two daughters by his first wife and five sons and ten daughters by his second wife. His eldest son, Peter succeeded to Clarendon  but it eventually passed to the descendants of his eldest daughter, Selina.

References 

Members of Parliament for Cirencester
British MPs 1710–1713
1687 births
1748 deaths
People educated at Eton College
Alumni of Trinity College, Oxford
Members of Parliament for Wilton
Members of Parliament for Salisbury
Peter
British MPs 1727–1734
British MPs 1734–1741